Fabian Wiede (born 8 February 1994) is a German handball player for Füchse Berlin and the German national team.

He participated at the 2019 World Men's Handball Championship.

Achievements
Summer Olympics:
: 2016
European Championship:
: 2016

References

External links
 
 
 

1994 births
Living people
People from Bad Belzig
German male handball players
Sportspeople from Brandenburg
Olympic handball players of Germany
Füchse Berlin Reinickendorf HBC players
Handball-Bundesliga players
Handball players at the 2016 Summer Olympics
Medalists at the 2016 Summer Olympics
Olympic bronze medalists for Germany
Olympic medalists in handball
Recipients of the Silver Laurel Leaf